Zhao Na (born 29 April 1984) is a road cyclist from China. She represented her nation at the 2006 UCI Road World Championships.

References

External links
 profile at Procyclingstats.com

1984 births
Chinese female cyclists
Living people
Place of birth missing (living people)
Asian Games medalists in cycling
Cyclists at the 2006 Asian Games
Cyclists at the 2010 Asian Games
Medalists at the 2006 Asian Games
Medalists at the 2010 Asian Games
Asian Games silver medalists for China
Asian Games bronze medalists for China
21st-century Chinese women